This is a list of saints and blesseds of the Catholic Church associated with the Canary Islands, today an archipelago part of Spain. In addition, the list includes the venerable and servants of God born or linked to the archipelago.

 Saints
 Peter of Saint Joseph de Betancur. Vilaflor (Tenerife) – (1626–1667). Franciscan missionary in Guatemala, founder of the Order of Bethlehemites and first saint of the Canary Islands. Canonized in 2002 by Pope John Paul II.
 José de Anchieta. San Cristóbal de La Laguna (Tenerife) – (1534–1597). Jesuit priest and missionary in Brazil. Canonized in 2014 by Pope Francis.
 Blesseds
 Martyrs of Tazacorte. In various parts of Portugal and Spain – (deceased in 1570). Monks and missionaries martyred off the coast of La Palma where they enjoy great veneration especially in Tazacorte, although none of them were themselves born in the Canary Islands it has included among the blessed of the archipelago. Beatified in 1854 by Pope Pius IX.
 Sister Lorenza Díaz Bolaños. Santa María de Guía (Gran Canaria) – (1896–1939). Religious and martyr belonging to the Daughters of Charity of Saint Vincent de Paul. Beatified in 2013 by Pope Francis with nearly 500 martyrs of the Spanish Civil War.
 Tomás Morales Morales. Carrizal de Ingenio (Gran Canaria) – (1907–1936). Dominican martyr. Beatified in 2022 by Pope Francis along with 26 other Dominicans shot in the Spanish Civil War.
 Venerable
 . La Ampuyenta (Fuerteventura) – (1800–1853). Franciscan friar.
 Antonio Vicente González Suárez. Agüimes (Gran Canaria) – (1817–1851). Religious.
 José Torres Padilla. San Sebastián de La Gomera (La Gomera) – (1811–1878). Religious.
 José Marcos Figueroa. Tinajo (Lanzarote) – (1865–1942). Religious.
 Servants of God
 Sister Mary of Jesus de León y Delgado. El Sauzal (Tenerife) – (1643–1731). Dominican and mystic nun.
 Sister Catalina de San Mateo de La Concepción. Santa María de Guía (Gran Canaria) – (1648–1695). Franciscan religious and mystical.
 Fray Juan de Jesús. Icod de los Vinos (Tenerife) – (1615–1687). Franciscan friar and mystic.
 . Las Palmas de Gran Canaria (Gran Canaria) – (1676–1759). Religious and mystic.
 Sister María de San Antonio Lorenzo y Fuentes. Garachico (Tenerife) – (1665–1741). Dominican nun.
 Buenaventura Codina y Augerolas. Hostalric (Gerona) – (1785–1857). Although he was not born in the Canary Islands, he was bishop of the Diocese Canariense.
 Sister María Justa de Jesús. La Victoria de Acentejo (Tenerife) – (1667–1723). Franciscan nun and mystic.
 José María Cueto y Díez de la Maza. Riocorvo (Cantabria) – (1839–1908). Although he was not born in the Canary Islands, he was bishop of the Diocese Canariense.
 José María Suárez. Teror (Gran Canaria) – (1890–1936). Religious.

See also 
 Diocese Nivariense
 Diocese Canariense
 Saints of Catalonia

References

External links 
 Website of Diocese Nivariense
 Website of Diocese Canariense

 
Canary Islands saints
Canary Islands
Saints
Canary Islands
Saints